The 2021–22 Syed Mushtaq Ali Trophy was the fourteenth season of the Syed Mushtaq Ali Trophy, a Twenty20 cricket tournament played in India. It was contested by 38 teams, divided into six groups, with eight teams in Plate Group. The tournament was announced by BCCI on 3 July 2021.

On 8 November 2021, in the match between Vidarbha and Manipur, Akshay Karnewar of Vidarbha became the first bowler to bowl four overs in a Twenty20 cricket match without conceding a run. The following day, in Vidarbha's match against Sikkim, Karnewar took a hat-trick. Vidarbha topped the group with five wins out of five to qualify for the preliminary quarter-finals.

Points table

Fixtures
Source:

Round 1

Round 2

Round 3

Round 4

Round 5

References

2021 in Indian cricket
Domestic cricket competitions in 2021–22